Go-Ahead Norge is a railway operator in Norway that commenced operations in December 2019. It is a subsidiary of the Go-Ahead Group. The branding used is Go-Ahead Nordic.

History
In October 2018, Go-Ahead Norge was awarded an eight-year contract by the Norwegian Railway Directorate to operate the Oslo South package, consisting of three routes operated by Vy beating off competition from SJ Norge and Vy with operations commencing on 15 December 2019.

Services
Go-Ahead Norge operates services on the Arendal, Jæren and Sørlandet Lines.

Rolling stock
Go-Ahead Norge operates 20 electric multiple units; two Class 69s, 11 Class 72s and seven Class 73s. It also operates three El 18 electric locomotives and 14 B7 carriages. All are leased from Norske Tog.

References

External links
 

Go-Ahead Group companies
Railway companies of Norway
Railway companies established in 2019
Norwegian companies established in 2019